Below is a list of important Persian figures in the Sassanid Empire (226-651):

List

Mani the prophet: Founder of Manichaeism.
Mazdak: Proto-socialist philosopher and founder of Mazdakism.
Bozorgmehr: Physician and minister of Khosrau I.
Purandokht (Boran): Sassanid queen.
Barbod the Great: Court musician of the king Khosrau II who created the first musical system in the Middle East, known as the Royal Khosravani and dedicated to the king himself.
Nagisa (Nakisa): The court musician who collaborated with Barbod on his famous septet piece the Royal Khosravani.
Sarkash: Though not as renowned as Barbod or Nakisa, he was a remarkable musician.
Rostam Farrokhzād: The last great general of Sassanids.  While unsuccessful at repelling the Arab Muslim invaders, Iranian folklore and history consider him a hero.
Salman the Persian: One of the Sahaba. He is among The Four Companions.

References

People from the Sasanian Empire